Star Wars: The Force Unleashed was a multimedia project developed by LucasArts along with Dark Horse Comics, Lego, Hasbro, and Del Rey Books. It consists of two video games: Star Wars: The Force Unleashed, released in September 2008, and its sequel, Star Wars: The Force Unleashed II, released in October 2010, as well as two tie-in novels, action figures, a comic book, a reference book, a role-playing game supplement, and a book on the making of the game.

After The Walt Disney Company acquired Lucasfilm in 2012 and began production of the Star Wars sequel trilogy, the Unleashed project, along with all other Star Wars expanded universe works, were declared non-canonical to the Star Wars franchise on April 25, 2014.

Story

Star Wars: The Force Unleashed tells the story of Darth Vader's secret apprentice, code-named "Starkiller" but born Galen Marek, as he hunts down the remaining Jedi after Emperor Palpatine orders them killed. Set between Star Wars: Episode III – Revenge of the Sith and Star Wars: Episode IV – A New Hope, the story explores the aftermath of the Great Jedi Purge as well as the rise of Darth Vader.  The events of The Force Unleashed are "pivotal" in Darth Vader's history and development as a character and offer illumination into other characters from A New Hope, The Empire Strikes Back, and Return of the Jedi. The game explores themes of redemption and self-sacrifice; aside from hunting Jedi, Starkiller helps build the Rebel Alliance on Vader's orders, who plots to overthrow the Emperor, but eventually comes to truly believe in the Rebel cause and sacrifices himself to save the Alliance's leaders from the Empire, who honor him by adopting his family's crest as their symbol.

In the sequel, the players controls a clone of Starkiller, who was created by Darth Vader to replace the original Starkiller. However, the clone has the original Starkiller's memories and begins to rebel against his master, eventually escaping to search for his identity. Along the way, he too comes to believe in the Rebel cause and helps capture Vader. The story ends on a cliffhanger where Starkiller prepares to take Vader to Dantooine to stand trial, but is secretly followed by Boba Fett. Due to the cancellation of the third game, as well as the previous two games being assigned into the discarded Legends brand of non-canonical stories, the cliffhanger may never be resolved.

Releases

Video games

Star Wars: The Force Unleashed

The Force Unleashed game was released in North America on September 16, 2008, and in Australia and Southeast Asia on September 17, 2008, and was released in Europe on September 19, 2008. The game follows the story of Darth Vader's secret apprentice Starkiller, who is tasked with hunting down Jedi while killing rebels and Imperials alike in order to hide his existence from the Emperor, but soon starts to slowly redeem himself to the light side of the Force. Starkiller was licensed to Namco Bandai Games to be a playable character in both the PlayStation 3 and Xbox 360 versions of Soulcalibur IV, and also appeared in Lego Star Wars III: The Clone Wars as an unlockable character.

Star Wars: The Force Unleashed II

A sequel was released on October 26, 2010. This time, the player assumes the role of a clone of Starkiller that, upon escaping from Darth Vader's clutches, embarks on a quest to find his identity and the original Starkiller's love interest, Juno Eclipse, but is soon forced to join the Rebel Alliance and help them bring down the Empire and Vader, who has captured Juno to lure the clone back to him.

Print works

Novel
Sean Williams' novelization was released in the United States on August 19, 2008. It spent one week as #1 on both Publishers Weeklys and The New York Times hardcover fiction bestsellers lists, slipping to #7 and #9, respectively, the following week. It also reached #15 on USA Todays bestsellers list.

Williams took on the writing project in part because of the "catchy description" of The Force Unleashed being "Episode 3.5" of the Star Wars saga. The novel focuses on the dark side of the Force and its practitioners; Williams found it "interesting" to portray the Jedi as "bad guys." The author most enjoyed developing the character of Juno Eclipse, exploring the "feminine" side of The Force Unleashed in a way the video game does not. Williams also said that while the game allows the player to "do" Starkiller's actions, the novel allows readers to experience Starkiller's thoughts about those actions, adding another dimension to the story.

Graphic novel
Dark Horse's The Force Unleashed graphic novel was published August 18, 2008. Newsarama called the graphic novel a "solid story" that matches the video game source material in both structure and plot. IGN gave the graphic novel a score of 6.9/10 (6.4/10 for art, 7.5/10 for the writing), praising the overall story but faulting inconsistency in the art and questioning whether the comic medium was the best way to convey the story.

Merchandise

At Toy Fair 2007, Hasbro showed seven figures from their action figure line based on the game. Lego released a model of the Starkiller's ship, the Rogue Shadow.

Legacy and third game cancellation
The Unleashed franchise was rendered non-canonical following Disney's decision to reboot expanded elements of Star Wars. Sam Witwer, Marek's voice actor, revealed that Dave Filoni considered bringing Marek into the new canon and with an appearance in Star Wars Rebels but decided against it because he could not find a way to do so without compromising either the new canon's quality or the character's unique distinctions. In 2021, Electronic Arts added Marek as a character in Star Wars: Galaxy of Heroes.

See also
 Star Wars: Shadows of the Empire

References

External links

Book series introduced in 2008
Multimedia works
Star Wars Legends novels
2008 novels